Darren Gleeson (born 19 March 1981) is an Irish hurler and manager who plays for Tipperary Senior Championship club Portroe and is currently managing the Antrim senior hurling team. He played for the Tipperary senior hurling team for 10 seasons, during which time he usually lined out as a goalkeeper.

Playing career

Portroe

Gleeson plays his club hurling with Portroe and has enjoyed some success.

In 2012 he won a North Tipperary championship medal following a 3-16 to 1-19 defeat of Toomevara.

Tipperary

Under-21

Gleeson first played for Tipperary as a member of the under-21 team during the 2002 Munster Championship when he served as sub-goalkeeper to team captain Damien Young. On 8 August 2002, he was listed amongst the substitutes when Tipperary drew 3-09 to 2-12 with Limerick in the Munster final. Gleeson was again amongst the substitutes when Tipperary suffered a 1-20 to 2-14 defeat in the replay on 21 August 2002.

Senior

In 2008 Gleeson joined the Tipperary senior hurling team as understudy to regular 'keeper Brendan Cummins. He was an unused substitute as Tipperary claimed that year's National Hurling League following a 3-18 to 3-16 victory. Gleeson was later included on Tipperary's championship panel and collected a Munster medal as a non-playing substitute following a 2-21 to 0-19 defeat of Clare.

Gleeson made his competitive debut the following season in a league game against Galway. Later that year he made his championship debut as a ten-minute blood sub for Brendan Cummins in a 1-19 to 0-19 Munster quarter-final defeat of Cork.

Gleeson was still a member of the Tipperary senior hurling panel in 2010. That year he collected an All-Ireland medal as a non-playing substitute following Tipp's 4-17 to 1-18 defeat of Kilkenny.

The following year Gleeson came on as substitute for Cummins after 64 minutes of the provincial decider. He won a Munster medal as a result of Tipp's 7-19 to 0-19 trouncing of Waterford.

Gleeson started the 2014 season as first choice goalkeeper for Tipperary due to the retirement of Brendan Cummins at the end of the 2013 season. He made his first start in the championship for Tipperary on 1 June 2014 in the Munster Championship against Limerick in a 2-18 to 2-16 defeat.

On 17 August 2014, Tipperary defeated Cork by 2-18 to 1-11 in the All-Ireland semi-final to reach the 2014 All-Ireland Senior Hurling Championship Final.
Former Cork goalkeeper Donal Óg Cusack speaking on the Sunday Game highlights programme on the night of the semi-final match said that in his opinion Gleeson had given the greatest ever display of tactical puckouts in the game saying "Darren Gleeson gave the greatest display of tactical puckouts ever seen... I want to put it on record: it was the greatest display of puckouts ever but the Cork defending was poor".

Gleeson started his first All Ireland final on 7 September 2014 against Kilkenny in a match that finished in a draw. Kilkenny went on to defeat Tipperary in the replay three weeks later.

In October 2014, Gleeson won his first All Stars Award after a successful 2014 campaign where Tipperary reached the All-Ireland Final.

On 4 September 2016, Gleeson won his second All-Ireland Senior hurling title when Tipperary defeated Kilkenny in the final by 2-29 to 2-20.

In October 2017, Gleeson announced his retirement from inter-county hurling, citing work and family commitments as the reasons.

Managerial career

Antrim

On 9 September 2019, Gleeson was ratified as manager of the Antrim senior hurling team.
He led the side to the 2020 National Hurling League Division 2A title when they overcame Kerry in the final by 2-23 to 2-20 on 18 October 2020.
Antrim went on to win the 2020 Joe McDonagh Cup after a 0-22 to 1-17 win over Kerry at Croke Park.

On 9 May 2021, Antrim defeated Clare by 1-21 to 0-22 in the opening round of the 2021 National Hurling League.

Personal life
On 4 May 2016, it was reported that he was banned from being a financial adviser by the Central Bank. 
In court in January 2017, Gleeson denied the charges of stealing €32,000 from a financial services client, pleading not guilty to two counts of stealing a total of €32,000 in 2013.
On 27 June 2017, Gleeson was given a three-and-a-half year suspended prison sentence after admitting an offence of obtaining €10,000 by deception from an elderly man in 2013.

Career statistics

As a player

As a manager

Honours

Player

Portroe
North Tipperary Senior Hurling Championship (1): 2012

Tipperary
All-Ireland Senior Hurling Championship (2): 2010, 2016
Munster Senior Hurling Championship (6): 2008, 2009, 2011, 2012, 2015, 2016
National Hurling League (1): 2008

Awards
All-Star (1): 2014

Manager

Antrim
National League Division 2A (1): 2020
Joe McDonagh Cup (1): 2020

References

1981 births
Living people
Portroe hurlers
Tipperary inter-county hurlers
Hurling goalkeepers
Hurling managers